The 1988 Fort Lauderdale Strikers season was the first season of the new team in the new American Soccer League.  It was the first outdoor team to be fielded by the club in a professional league in four years, since the original North American Soccer League.  It was the club's twenty-second season in professional soccer.  This also marked the return of the Fort Lauderale Striker's name after moving the club back from Minnesota to Florida.  Previously, the club had been represented as the Minnesota Strikers.
During their inaugural year in the ASL, the team won the Southern Division and made it through the playoffs and into the ASL Championship.  They were this year's Runner's-up.

Background

Review

Competitions

ASL regular season

Northern Division

Southern Division

Results summaries

Results by round

Match reports

ASL Playoffs

Bracket

Match reports

Semifinal 1

Semifinal 2

Final

1988 ASL All-Star game
The ASL All-Star game was hosted by the Fort Lauderdale Strikers at Lockhart Stadium. Players that were unable to play due to injury, as well as any Strikers selected to the squad were replaced, since the All-Stars' opponent was the Strikers. George Best also suited up for the Strikers in the match. The match ended in a 3–3 draw after 90 minutes, and moved directly to a penalty shootout. Both teams converted four of five attempts, and in an unusual move agreed to end it there with the consent of the referees.

Match summary

Statistics

Transfers

References 

1988
Fort Lauderdale Strikers
Fort Lauderdale Strikers